Wolfershausen is one of the sixteen constituent communities that form the town of Felsberg in Schwalm-Eder-Kreis, North Hesse, Germany.

Geography 

The village is situated on the western (cut) bank of the river Eder. To the west of the village is the Lotterberg, a volcano that was active in the Miocene and became extinct .

History 

Wolfershausen was first mentioned in 1061 in a document from the Fulda monastery. The abbot, Widerad von Eppenstein, transferred the land and farm of a gentleman and his wife from Maden to a monastery at Morschen. In this exchange, the towns of Wolfeshuson, Hebel and Heßlar were involved. The gentry of Wolferhausen were liegemen, that is they were noblemen who were obliged to pay a tithe to the Saint Peter's Church in Fritzlar. In 1232 Landgrave Konrad von Thüringen attacked the town of Fritzlar. The knights from Wolfershausen were defending the Heiligenburg Castle, which was destroyed in the landgrave's attack. The Archbishop Siegfried III from Mainz gave the order for the castle to be rebuilt. This decision caused the nobles of Wolfershausen to transfer their allegiance to the Landgrave, which caused them great loss later on (for instance the loss of their castle). In fact, the nobles of Wolfershausen often transferred their loyalty to the side that brought them the most, many times over history.

The coat of arms for Wolfershausen originates from 1259. The shield is party per fess: upper — a wolf courant to dexter, armed and langued, lower — three annulets argent in pile on azure. In 1273, the castle, which was built by the Wolfershausen noble family, was probably destroyed by soldiers from Fritzlar and never subsequently rebuilt.

In 1291 the town was mentioned as Wolfershusen and Wolfishusen. In 1357 the town was called Wolfartdeshusen. In 1465 the Breitenau Monastery (in Guxhagen) purchased the patronage of the church from the noble family von Löwenstein. In 1555 the town belonged to Felsberg, in 1585 it was administered by Kassel.

On 1 January 1972 the town joined the newly formed municipality of Brunslar. This was incorporated into the town of Felsberg on 1 January 1974.

Church 

In the 13th Century, after 1273, a fortified church, with a square tower, was built on the remains of the old castle. The present-day aisle was constructed in the Gothic art style around 1484.

Monuments 

 The menhir Riesenstein, 1.14 km to the north of the town. 
 The Gothic art-style church.

References 

Villages in Hesse